Sidi Bellagh Mosque, is a Tunisian mosque located in the Halfaouine hood in the northern suburb of the medina of Tunis.

Localization 
It can be found in 156 Halfaouine Street next to Saheb Ettabaâ Mosque.

Etymology 
The mosque got its name from a saint called cheikh Abi Kacem El Bellagh who lived in the 8th century and who was known for his morals and his wisdom.

History 
It was probably built in the 9th century. And till this day, it serves for the five daily prayers and for the tarawih during ramadan.

References 

Mosques in Tunis
9th-century mosques